Agus Nova Wiantara (born 29 November 1992 in Tabanan) is an Indonesian professional footballer who plays as a centre-back for Liga 1 club RANS Nusantara.

International career
Agus called up to Indonesia under-21 team and played in 2012 Hassanal Bolkiah Trophy, but failed to win after losing 0-2 from Brunei under-21 team.

Honours

International
Indonesia U-21
Hassanal Bolkiah Trophy runner-up: 2012

References

External links
 Agus Nova Wiantara at Soccerway
 Agus Nova Wiantara at Liga Indonesia

Indonesian footballers
Indonesian Hindus
1992 births
Living people
Sportspeople from Bali
Pro Duta FC players
Bali United F.C. players
Indonesia youth international footballers
Association football central defenders